Toby Keith is the debut studio album by American country music artist Toby Keith. Released on April 20, 1993 by Mercury Records, it features the singles "Should've Been a Cowboy", "He Ain't Worth Missing", "A Little Less Talk and a Lot More Action", and "Wish I Didn't Know Now". Respectively, these songs peaked at No. 1, No. 5, No. 2, and No. 2 on the Hot Country Songs charts. The album sold more than one million copies in the United States, earning RIAA platinum certification. All the songs, except for "Some Kinda Good Kinda Hold On Me" and "A Little Less Talk and a Lot More Action", were written by Toby Keith.

"A Little Less Talk and a Lot More Action" was previously recorded by Hank Williams, Jr. on his album Maverick (1992).

A remastered 25th anniversary edition, retitled Should’ve Been a Cowboy as a nod to the hit single from the album, was released on November 30, 2018 with three bonus tracks added.

Track listing
All songs composed by Toby Keith except "Some Kinda Good Kinda Hold on Me" (written by Chuck Cannon and Jimmy Alan Stewart) and "A Little Less Talk and a Lot More Action" (written by Keith Hinton and Jimmy Alan Stewart).
"Should've Been a Cowboy" – 3:30
"He Ain't Worth Missing" – 3:05
"Under the Fall" – 3:22
"Some Kinda Good Kinda Hold on Me" – 3:31
"Wish I Didn't Know Now" – 3:26
"Ain't No Thang" – 3:27
"Valentine" – 3:34
"A Little Less Talk and a Lot More Action" – 2:49
"Mama Come Quick" – 3:23
"Close but No Guitar" – 2:46
"Tossin' and Turnin'" - 2:48 (25th Anniversary bonus track)
"I'll Still Call You Baby" - 3:33 (25th Anniversary bonus track)
"Daddy Mac" - 1:52 (25th Anniversary bonus track)

Personnel
Musicians
 Kenny Bell - acoustic guitar
 Michael Black - background vocals
 Mark Casstevens - acoustic guitar, harmonica
 Michael Crossno - electric guitar
 Thom Flora - background vocals
 Sonny Garrish - steel guitar, Dobro
 Carl "Chuck" Goff Jr. - bass guitar
 Clayton Ivey - keyboards
 Jim Kimball - electric guitar
 Gary Lunn - bass guitar
 Scott Marcha - drums
 Don Potter - acoustic guitar
 Milton Sledge - drums
 Denis Solee - saxophone
 Troy Turner - keyboards
 John Willis - electric guitar
 Dennis Wilson - background vocals
 Lonnie Wilson - background vocals
 Reggie Young - electric guitar

Technical
 Jim Cotton - engineering
 Nelson Larkin - producer
 Ron "Snake" Reynolds - overdubs
 Joe Scaife - engineer
 Harold Shedd - producer
 Ronnie Thomas - digital editing
 Hank Williams - mastering

Charts

Weekly charts

Year-end charts

References

1993 debut albums
Toby Keith albums
Mercury Nashville albums
Albums produced by Harold Shedd